Treat Huey and Scott Lipsky won the title, defeating Marc López and David Marrero in the final, 6–1, 6–4.

Seeds

Draw

Draw

References
 Main Draw

Estoril Open - Doubles
D